Stuyvesant Plaza is an upscale shopping plaza and office complex located in the Albany suburb of Guilderland, on Western Avenue (US 20), near the south end of the Adirondack Northway. The shopping portion in its current incarnation features shops like Pottery Barn, Talbots, and White House/Black Market. The complex includes a number of high and low rise office buildings near the shopping center. The shopping plaza opened in 1959, making it the third oldest in the Capital Region, after Latham Corners Shopping Center in 1957.

Development
The plaza was built by Lewis A. Swyer and opened in 1959. By 1960, it had 35 stores and was U shaped, as it is today. Stuyvesant Plaza is on a  parcel.

Opening
Stuyvesant Plaza opened on November 4, 1959 with ceremonies beginning at 10am.

Ownership
Stuyvesant Plaza and Executive Park office suites are owned by the Swyer Companies.

Size

Facelifts
By 1981, Stuyvesant Plaza as a shopping center was performing poorly.  It was an average strip mall with no serious distinction.  Consultants suggested the complex focus on discount retailers.  However, the complex ended up focusing on small, non-chain retailers.  It was predicted that this would lead to ruin for the plaza.  The gamble paid off and a facelift was completed by the mid 1980s.  The facelift caused the strip mall to be one of the top performers along the East Coast.  By early 1987, there were 62 specialty retail stores at the plaza. By May 2015, the center had received what one source referred to as an "upscale evolution".

Sources

Shopping malls in Albany County, New York
Guilderland, New York